Braunston and Willoughby railway station was a station on the former Great Central Main Line. It served the small village of Willoughby which it was located next to, and the larger but more distant village of Braunston. The station opened with the line on 15 March 1899.

History
The station was one of the standard island platform design typical of the London Extension, though here it was the less common "embankment" type reached from a roadway (the A45 Coventry to Daventry road), that passed beneath the line.

Braunston, also in Northamptonshire, lay between the two, some two miles away and also served by the same LNWR branch that ran through Daventry, but it was Braunston that was found to be providing the new Great Central station with the bulk of its usage. This was reflected in a renaming on 1 January 1904 to Braunston and Willoughby for Daventry (the for Daventry was eventually dropped in 1938).

  
Braunston and Willoughby station closed to passengers and goods on 1 April 1957 and the line itself closed on 5 September 1966. The station buildings had already been removed in 1961-2 although the platform remained for a while longer. Today there is little left to see at the site. The twin bridges over the A45 have been removed and the abutment walls substantially lowered. The stationmaster's house remains, however. A short distance to the south of the station was the 13-arch Willoughby Viaduct crossing the River Leam: this viaduct has now gone.

The other line passing through the area - the former LNWR Weedon to Leamington Spa branch line, via Daventry, closed on 15 September 1958.

Route

References

External links
 Warwickshire Railways entry on this station

Disused railway stations in Warwickshire
Former Great Central Railway stations
Railway stations in Great Britain opened in 1899
Railway stations in Great Britain closed in 1957
1899 establishments in England
1957 disestablishments in England